Mount Wycheproof is a mountain in the small town of Wycheproof, Victoria, Australia, which stands at  above the surrounding terrain and 147 metres (482 ft) above sea level making it the smallest registered mountain in the world. The township of Wycheproof is located on the hillside, and a unique geological substance known as Wycheproofite is exclusive to the local area.

History
The township of Wycheproof is located on the hill's south western slopes The settlement was started as early as 1846, but the township was not surveyed until 1875. The name 'Wycheproof' originates from the local Aboriginal language, 'wichi-poorp', meaning 'grass on a hill'. The hill plays a role in the local community, with annual races to the hilltop. There are many walking tracks in the area, and local wildlife such as emus and kangaroos can be seen.

Geology
Mount Wycheproof is a granite outcrop. Located in a flat grassland area, the rounded terrain of Mount Wycheproof is consistent with that of the surrounding area. Sharing several similarities to nearby Pyramid Hill, Mount Wycheproof is part of the low-lying Terrick Terrick range. Phosphate materials are relatively rare in Victoria, yet the Wycheproof area is known to have its own unique mineral, known as wycheproofite. Wycheproofite can be characterised by its pinkish colour and its transparency.

References 

Mountains of Victoria (Australia)